The 2022 United States House of Representatives election in American Samoa was held on Tuesday, November 8, 2022, to elect the non-voting Delegate to the United States House of Representatives from American Samoa's at-large congressional district. The election coincided with races for other federal and American Samoan territorial offices, including the larger American Samoa general election, as well as the nationwide 2022 United States House of Representatives elections and the 2022 United States general elections. 

Incumbent delegate, Rep. Amata Coleman Radewagen, a Republican who had held the seat since 2015, filed for re-election to a fifth term.

Background
In November 2014, Amata Coleman Radewagen defeated 10-term incumbent Democratic Rep. Eni Faleomavaega in a crowded race for the seat. She won re-election to a fourth term in 2020. She is currently running unopposed for a fifth term.

Candidates

Republican
Amata Coleman Radewagen, incumbent Delegate in the United States House of Representatives

References

2022
American Samoa
United States House of Representatives